Lionel Hallam Tennyson, 3rd Baron Tennyson (7 November 1889 – 6 June 1951) was known principally as a first-class cricketer who captained Hampshire and England. The grandson of the poet Alfred, Lord Tennyson and the son of the Governor-General of Australia, he succeeded his father to the title in 1928, having been known before that as "The Hon Lionel Tennyson".  He should not be confused with his uncle, after whom he was named, who was also "The Hon Lionel Tennyson".

Life and career
As a schoolboy at Eton College, Tennyson was a fast bowler, but by the time he took up regular first-class cricket with Hampshire in 1913, he bowled very rarely. He was a Wisden Cricketer of the Year in 1914.

During World War I he served with The Rifle Brigade in France. He was Mentioned in Despatches twice and three times wounded.  His two younger brothers were killed in the war.

Tennyson played nine Test matches for England, five of them on the tour of South Africa under Johnny Douglas in 1913/14. In 1921, England having lost six Test matches in succession to the Australians under Warwick Armstrong, Tennyson was recalled to the side for the second Test at Lord's, and though the game was again lost, he scored an undefeated 74 in the second innings against Jack Gregory and Ted McDonald at their fastest. That innings led him to be appointed captain for the three remaining matches of the series, succeeding Douglas. The next game was lost; the final two matches were left drawn. At Headingley in the first of these three games as captain, Tennyson split his hand while fielding in the Australians' first innings but, patched up with what Wisden called a "basket guard", he made 63 and 36. He led several non-Test match tours overseas, to India, South Africa and the West Indies.

Tennyson was captain of Hampshire from 1919 to 1932. He was in charge of the side in the remarkable match against Warwickshire in 1922, when Hampshire were bowled out for 15 runs in their first innings and, having been forced to follow on, then scored 521 in the second innings and won the match by 155 runs.

In 1933 he published his autobiography, From Verse to Worse. Returning from his second war-wound to the Western Front he records: "I have never liked 'travelling light', and so, though the amount of kit I arrived with may, in fact, have aroused a certain amount of astonishment, I was quickly forgiven by my commanding officer as well as by everyone else, when they found out that it included, amongst other things, a case of champagne." He published a second volume of memoirs, Sticky Wickets, in 1950.

He was appointed Honorary Colonel of 51st (London) Heavy Anti-Aircraft Regiment, Royal Artillery (a Territorial Army unit based in Chelsea, London) on 9 August 1931 and held the position until 1947.

He married Clare Tennant in 1918. They had three sons before they divorced in 1928. He was later married to Carroll Elting (formerly Donner) from 1934 until their divorce in 1943.

References

External links

From Verse To Worse by Lionel Tennyson (1933) (digitised version)
Brief footage of Tennyson from British Pathe (at 3.55, 4.14 and 7.00)

1889 births
1951 deaths
Barons Tennyson
England Test cricketers
England Test cricket captains
English cricketers
Hampshire cricket captains
Hampshire cricketers
Wisden Cricketers of the Year
People educated at Eton College
Coldstream Guards officers
British Army personnel of World War I
Rifle Brigade officers
Gentlemen cricketers
British Army cricketers
North v South cricketers
Marylebone Cricket Club cricketers
Lionel
L. H. Tennyson's XI cricket team
S. B. Joel's XI cricketers
English cricketers of 1919 to 1945
Military personnel from London
H. D. G. Leveson Gower's XI cricketers
Eldest sons of British hereditary barons
Marylebone Cricket Club South African Touring Team cricketers